–

Haim Pontramoli (born 9 August 1981) is an Israeli association footballer who plays for Hapoel Kiryat Ono. He previously played for Hapoel Be'er Sheva, Hakoah Ramat Gan and Hapoel Ra'anana.

References

1981 births
Israeli Jews
Living people
Israeli footballers
Hapoel Ramat Gan F.C. players
Hapoel Tzafririm Holon F.C. players
Maccabi HaShikma Ramat Hen F.C. players
Hapoel Be'er Sheva F.C. players
Hakoah Maccabi Amidar Ramat Gan F.C. players
Hapoel Ra'anana A.F.C. players
Sektzia Ness Ziona F.C. players
Hapoel Azor F.C. players
Maccabi Kiryat Gat F.C. players
Hapoel Hod HaSharon F.C. players
Beitar Kfar Saba F.C. players
F.C. Ironi Or Yehuda players
F.C. Holon Yermiyahu players
Hapoel Kiryat Ono F.C. players
Liga Leumit players
Israeli Premier League players
Israeli people of Italian-Jewish descent
Association football defenders